Damon S. Feltman is a United States Air Force brigadier general serving as the mobilization assistant to the deputy chief of space operations for strategy, plans, programs, requirements, and analysis of the United States Space Force. He previously served as the mobilization assistant to the director of operations of the United States Space Command

References

External links 
 

Living people
Year of birth missing (living people)
Place of birth missing (living people)
United States Air Force generals
Brigadier generals